Sean Teale (born 18 June 1992) is a British actor, known for his roles as Prince Condé in Reign, Nick Levan in Skins, and Ben Larson in the Syfy series Incorporated. He also co-starred in the Fox sci-fi/drama series The Gifted.

Early life
Teale grew up in Putney, London. He is of Venezuelan, Spanish, and Welsh descent. His father, Noel, is an IT consultant and his mother, Fini, works at a design advertising agency. Teale attended Latymer Upper School in Hammersmith where he played rugby and football and took drama.

His performance in a school play was spotted by an agent in the audience. Teale decided to switch his focus from sports to drama after his agents advised him to renounce for fear of damaging his looks. He began auditions as he was preparing for his A-levels in History, Drama and Economics. He has deferred his place at the University of Manchester studying History and Economics to pursue his acting career.

Career
In January 2010 Teale played Derek in the short film Sergeant Slaughter, My Big Brother directed by Greg Williams starring Tom Hardy. Winner of Best Direction at the Chicago Short Film Fest 2010, the film was released into the film festival circuit in 2011. In the same year he played a werewolf in Nickelodeon’s Summer in Transylvania.

Teale gained popularity in 2011, when he landed a lead role as Nick Levan in the fifth and sixth series of E4 BAFTA-winning drama Skins, after originally auditioning for Rider, a minor role. Subsequently he appeared in History Channel's The Bible, a 10-hour docudrama created by Mark Burnett, and played regular roles in the second series of the period dramas Mr Selfridge and Reign.

In 2012 he was cast in Abominable Snowman (originally called Deadly Descent), a horror TV film directed by Marko Mäkilaakso and released on the American channel Syfy. In March 2012 he filmed, in Birmingham, We Are the Freaks, a teen comedy directed by Justin Edgar first screened at the Edinburgh International Film Festival 2013 and released in cinemas in 2014.

In 2015 he was in James McTeigue's thriller film Survivor and The Red Tent, a biblical television series filmed in Morocco. He starred in the short-lived USA Network TV series Incorporated in 2016.

Beginning in autumn 2017, Teale began his new role as Marcos Diaz, also known by his handle of "Eclipse," in Atlanta's barely-futuristic mutant world of mostly young people with special powers—where they are now hunted as criminals—in the new Fox sci-fi/drama series The Gifted. Although based on the Marvel Comics''' X-Men feature film series, The Gifted'' takes place in an alternate timeline where all of The X-Men are missing. Eclipse can manipulate photons. Diaz grew up parentless, starting out as a younger man running drugs between México and the U.S., leading to his current passion of trafficking at-risk hunted mutants to relative safety.

Filmography

References

External links
 

Living people
1992 births
British actors of Latin American descent
English male film actors
English male television actors
English people of Spanish descent
English people of Venezuelan descent
English people of Welsh descent
Male actors from London
People educated at Latymer Upper School
People from Putney